Paintball Massacre is a 2020 British comedy horror film directed by Darren Berry and written by Chris Regan.

Plot
A school reunion paintballing goes wrong as the participants start being murdered one by one.

Cast
Katy Brand
Lee Latchford-Evans
Natasha Killip
Aoife Smyth
Nicholas Vince
Robert Portal
Ian Virgo
Cheryl Burniston
Lockhart Ogilvie
Nathan Clough

Production
The filmmakers have cited British comedy-horror features Hot Fuzz and Dog Soldiers as inspiration. It was filmed in 2018 in Somerset, at The Sparkford Inn near Yeovil as well as in a quarry in Radstock.

Release
The film was released in US and Canada in December 2020 and released digitally and on DVD in the UK on April 5, 2021.

Reception
The Guardian review said the film struggles to live up to illustrious Brit comedy-horror predecessors. Dread Central reviewed it as “Fun-Filled Microbudget Mayhem”.

References

2020 films
2020 comedy horror films
British comedy horror films
2020s English-language films
2020s British films